The Benchmade Knife Company is an American knife manufacturer in Oregon City, Oregon.

History 
Benchmade originally started in California in 1979 as Bali-Song, then changed their name to Pacific Cutlery Corporation in the early 1980s. The company changed their name to "Benchmade" in 1988. In 1990 the company moved to Clackamas, Oregon. In 1996, the company moved to a 144,000 square foot facility in Oregon City, Oregon. Benchmade became known primarily as a manufacturer of butterfly knives, or balisongs, and they continue to be manufactured under their registered trademark name "Bali-Song". Benchmade's original Bali-Song design by Jody Samson was awarded Blade Magazine's Knife of the Year Award in 1979.

Founder Les De Asis died February 21, 2020, following a stroke. Roberta De Asis held the position of President and CEO following his death and was succeeded by her son Jon in October 2020.

Headquarters location
In 1996, Benchmade moved to Oregon City. Apart from some Red Class products, which were produced in their "off shore facilities", Benchmade has produced more than 90% of its knives in Oregon City, and has succeeded in bringing others back to home production.  Since 2010, all Red Class production knives have been discontinued, and as such, every Benchmade labeled knife is made in the United States.

One of the reasons the Benchmade factory headquarters and many other knife companies are located in Oregon, is that Oregon has more relaxed laws towards the ownership and selling of knives, with switchblades or butterfly knives in particular. There are no restrictions against selling a switchblade-style knife to an Oregon resident.

Products
Blade steels such as 154CM, D2, CPM S30V steel, CPM S90V steel, CPM 20CV, N690 and M390 are used on many models. Benchmade is one of the few manufacturers to have used high speed M2 and CPM M4 tool steels in a production knife.

Benchmade receives a significant amount of revenue from selling restricted-sales knives to the military and law enforcement. Benchmade produces a diverse selection of "auto", or switchblade knives, along with a range of hunting, fishing, utility and miscellaneous knives, though balisongs remain a core product.

Benchmade has three different knife classes. The first class is the Blue Class, also known as the Recreation class. This type of Benchmade knife is made for typical use by the everyday person. The next class is the Black Class, also known as the Professional class. This type of Benchmade knife is made for military, law enforcement, and public safety workers. The last class is the Gold class, also known as the Collector class. This class of Benchmade knife is made for collectors and are limited edition.

Benchmade has a patent on the locking mechanism used in most of the switchblades they produce. Benchmade additionally holds an exclusive license on use of the McHenry / Williams "AXIS Lock", a spring operated locking mechanism used in both automatic and manual action models. The AXIS lock is extolled by many knife enthusiasts for its one-handed operation, strength, and ambidexterity, qualities some say are not shared by other knife locks such as the linerlock, framelock, or lockback. This type of lock also has a smaller chance of accidentally being pressed during use.

Benchmade has a long tradition of incorporating knife design from noted custom cutlery makers into their production models. These include Jody Samson, Ernest Emerson, Allen Elishewitz, Mel Pardue, Bill McHenry, Mike Snody, Jason Williams, Warren Osborne, Ken Steigerwalt, and Bob Lum. Several production Benchmade models based on the work of these designers have become influential within the industry.

Some of the Benchmade knife models include:
Benchmade Griptilian
Benchmade Freek
Benchmade Crooked River
Benchmade Bushcrafter
Benchmade Infidel
Benchmade SOCP
Benchmade 556 Mini Griptilian
Benchmade Contego (Discontinued)
Benchmade 940 Osborne
Benchmade BKC Bedlam Axis
Benchmade Serum (Discontinued)
Benchmade Mini Barrage
Benchmade Model 42
Benchmade Model 535 Bugout
Benchmade Model 537 Bailout
Benchmade Model 51 Morpho

Awards and honors 
Benchmade has won several awards and recognition for product innovation and design.

 The Shooting Industry Academy of Excellence Knife of the Year Winner, Benchmade 915 Triage (2011)
 Field & Stream Best Fixed Blade Knife Winner, Benchmade 162 Bushcrafter (2013)
 Kokatat American Made Outdoor Gear 'Sassy' Award Winner, Benchmade (2014)
 50 Campfires Gear of the Year Award Winner, Benchmade 551 Griptilian (2014)
 Knife News Dealer's Choice Best Overall Award Winner, Benchmade (2016)
 Oregon Manufacturing Awards, Product Innovation Category Winner, Benchmade (2017)

Gallery

References

External links

 

Knife manufacturing companies
Oregon City, Oregon
Manufacturing companies established in 1979
Manufacturing companies based in Oregon
Privately held companies based in Oregon
Companies based in Clackamas County, Oregon